Dupee is a surname. Notable people with the surname include:

Caroline Dupee Wade (1857–1947), American painter
Dave Dupee (1916–2008), American professional basketball player
F. W. Dupee (1904–1979), American literary critic
Frank Dupee (1877–1956), American baseball player
George Washington Dupee (1826–1897), American slave-turned-Baptist leader
Kenneth Dupee Swan (1887–1970), American photographer
Leonard Dupee White (1891–1958), American historian
Michael George Dupée (born 1966), American game show contestant and author